Lucy Ashjian (1907–1993) was an American photographer best known as a member of the New York Photo League. Her work is included in the collections of the Metropolitan Museum of Art, New York, the Center for Creative Photography in Tucson, Arizona and the Museum of the City of New York.

Early life
Ashjian was born in Indianapolis, Indiana to Armenian refugees. She received a degree in English from Butler University in 1927. In 1937 she graduated from the Clarence H. White School of Photography.

Career
Ashjian joined the New York Photo League in 1937 as a photographer, also serving as Photos Notes editor and board chair of the League's school.

She was included in the 2012 exhibition The Radical Camera: New York's Photo League, 1936–1951 held at the Jewish Museum, New York.

Collections
Ashjian's work is held in the following permanent collections:
Center for Creative Photography, Tucson, Arizona
Columbus Museum of Art, Columbus, Ohio
George Eastman Museum
The Jewish Museum, New York
Metropolitan Museum of Art, New York
Museum of the City of New York
Philadelphia Museum of Art
Princeton University Art Museum

References

20th-century American photographers
1907 births
1993 deaths
20th-century American women photographers